Fabio Semenzato (born 6 May 1986) is an Italian rugby union player. His regular playing position is as a scrum-half. He plays currently for Mogliano.

Semenzato played for Benetton Treviso from 2005 to 2014  and in 2015 he was named as Additional Player for Zebre.

Semenzato already played for Italy A and was selected for the Italian national team at the 2010 Six Nations Championship. In the 2011 Six Nations Championship he was the first choice scrum-half for Italy. He was voted second best player of the tournament, after fellow Italian Andrea Masi.

References

External links
RBS 6 Nations profile

It's Rugby England Profile

1986 births
Italy international rugby union players
Italian rugby union players
Living people
Benetton Rugby players
Rugby union scrum-halves